Gil Mi-hyun (Hangul: 길미현, born April 10, 1985), known by the stage name Gilme (길미), is a South Korean singer and member of Clover. She was a contestant on Unpretty Rapstar 2. She released her debut album, Love Actually, on July 29, 2010.

Discography

Studio albums

Charted singles

As lead artist

As featured artist

Soundtrack appearances

References

1985 births
Living people
South Korean women rappers
21st-century South Korean women singers
21st-century South Korean singers